Rasu Jilani is an independent curator, social sculptor, and an entrepreneur whose work is to investigate the intersection between art, culture and civic engagement as a means of raising critical consciousness. The objective of his work is to activate interaction between artists, the local community and the wider public in order to promote awareness around social issues through exhibitions, humanities, community programs, and cultural events.

Influence 
The seed of Rasu Jilani's social consciousness began in the late 1980s. In 1989, Public Enemy's “Fight The Power” video in response to Spike Lee’s film “Do The Right Thing,” in the midst of the rising racial tension in NYC due to the death of Yusef Hawkins, has had a profound effect on the way he sees art and its impact on communities. Yusef Hawkins could have been him; he was only a few years older than him, and it was the first time it sank in that he could be a victim of police brutality or a racial crime. This sparked a consciousness of empathy for someone he had not already known, which is the notion of seeing yourself in someone else's struggle. It was the first time that he can recall seeing socially engaged artists rally a community, redirecting the energy to honor the heroes, collective celebration and created an artistic product as a result. In addition, Hip Hop has influenced his approach to including communities as a critical piece to his practice as a community organizer and art producer. In 2008, Coup d’etat Brooklyn was conceived as a business on his stoop in Bedstuy. It is also the place where his activism was realized, where stories from the neighborhood were shared, and the sense of community was reinforced.

Career 
Rasu Jilani is an art curator and develops professional programs in the community. The goal of his work is to increase collaboration between artists, local community, and the public to raise awareness around contemporary social issues. He accomplishes this through art exhibitions, volunteering in the community, developing local community programs and cultural events.

Jilani has worked with over 125 artists to curate, design and manage artistic and community events that address social concerns and local issues. He spent two years as a member at Culture and Sustainability at the Pratt Center for Community Development. This is where he oversaw art and cultural programs that connected New York City communities with Pratt Center's community and environmental sustainability projects. Jilani has also served two years as Senior Fellow of the Arts. While at Pratt, projects included Arts East New York's Summer Saturdaze at East New York Farms, Bedford Stuyvesant's Retrofit Block-by-Block, Bedford Stuyvesant Restoration Corporation’s Restoration Rocks and Youth Arts Education, Brooklyn Greens Sustainability Leadership Conference, Cypress Hill Verde Summit, and the “Amplify Action: Sustainability Through The Arts” exhibition.

Jilani cofounded Coup d'etat Arts in 2008 which is a platform for creative expression and changes cultural boundaries. The collective provides a platform for creative synergy while filling an undeniable void in the arts and culture community. These events have taken places at significant venues such as, Afropunk Festival, BEAT Festival, Long Island University, Pratt Institute, Columbia University, The New School, Mighty Tanaka Gallery, and the Skylight Gallery.

In April 2013, Jilani was Director of Community Programs at MAPP International Productions. At MAPP he was featured in the 2016 exhibit Blink Your Eyes: Sekou Sundiata Revisited, Triple Consciousness: Black Feminism(s) in the Time of Now, Days of Art and Ideas, and has led workshops.

Jilani became an Artist-in Residence for the Laundromat Project in 2015. During his residency, he worked on the project "Griots in the Stuy" using the West African oral tradition of griots to create a narrative of residents' personal stories, photography and a parallel narrative around gentrification in the Bedford-Stuyvesant neighborhood of Brooklyn.

Exhibitions

Recent Projects 
 Brooklyn Greens Sustainability Leadership Conference: “Greening from the Ground Up!”, 2012
 Cypress Hills Verde Summit – Youth Arts Workshop, Fall 2011
 Restoration Rocks, 2011 – “Live Healthy, Live Green, Live Well”
 Bed-Stuy Restoration – Youth Arts Program, Summer 2011
 Cypress Hills Energy Block Party, Summer 2011
 Coup d’etat Artshow – “Live to change something Through Art”, Fall 2009
 Afropunk Festival, Art Production, 2008, 2009, 2010, 2012

Venues curated 
 Skylight Gallery, Bedford-Stuyvesant Restoration Corporation
 Long Island University, Salena Gallery, Flatbush Campus
 SlyArt & Robot City
 Brooklyn Academy of Music

References

External links 
 Create Change spotlight, Rasu Jilani on YouTube
 Rasu Jilani, Owner + Creator Coup d'etat BK :: 120 Seconds on YouTube

Living people
Year of birth missing (living people)